Slippery Rock Brook is a tributary of the Passaic River in Passaic County, New Jersey in the United States.

Slippery Rock Brook flows north as it drains part of the western flank of First Watchung Mountain.  Traveling south from its confluence with the Passaic River, it passes through the city of Paterson and the borough of Woodland Park.

Course

Turning west, the brook travels a short distance before forming the New Street Reservoir and Highland Lake, both man-made ponds.

At Highland Lake the brook turns north again, flowing under Interstate 80 as it enters Paterson. The brook takes on an urban appearance as it winds its last half mile to the Passaic River with its mouth in Pennington Park.

Ecology
The majority of Slippery Rock Brook’s riparian corridor has been overrun by urbanization, but a significant section remains intact through Garret Mountain Reservation.  South of Barbour Pond, the brook passes through a ravine shaded by a stand of  yellow birch and witch-hazel.  Rhododendrons and trout lily are known to line the banks along this section of the brook, adding vibrant colors to the riparian environment during the flowering season in May.

See also
List of rivers of New Jersey

References

External links
TopoQuest map depicting Slippery Rock Brook in Paterson and Woodland Park

Rivers of Passaic County, New Jersey
Tributaries of the Passaic River
Rivers of New Jersey